KMTN (96.9 FM, " 96.9 The Mountain") is a radio station broadcasting an Album Adult Alternative format. Licensed to Jackson, Wyoming, United States, the station is owned by Scott Anderson, through licensee Jackson Hole Radio, LLC. Anderson has managed the station for over 25 years. He also served as a Jackson, Wyoming Town councilman for 12 years.
KMTN is programmed by award-winning AAA programmer Mark Fishman.
KMTN was founded by "Captain" Bob Morris in 1974 and officially licensed on January 28, 1975.

References

External links
 Official Website
 

MTN